Lady Lake is the second studio album of the British progressive rock band, Gnidrolog. The album was recorded in the London Morgan Studios in 1972 and released that same year. The album was re-issued in the UK in 1999 and in Japan in 2009. The songs in the album deal with a variety of concepts varying from pacifism in "I Could Never Be a Soldier", to pilgrimage in "Ship", and Tchaikovsky's Swan Lake in the title track, "Lady Lake". The band broke up shortly after the album was released due to lack of commercial success, but would eventually reunite to record another album in 1999.

Track listing

All lead vocals by Colin Goldring, except "Social Embarrassment", sung by John "Irish" Earle.

Personnel
 Colin Goldring - rhythm guitar, vocals, recorder, tenor horn
 Stewart Goldring - lead guitar 
 Peter "Mars" Cowling - bass guitar, cello
 Nigel Pegrum - percussion, flute, oboe
 John Earle -  soprano, tenor and baritone saxes, flute, lead vocal on "Social Embarrassment"
 Charlotte Fendrich - piano on "Same Dreams"

References

1972 albums
Gnidrolog albums